Hans Gfäller was a German luger who competed in the early 1910s. He won a silver medal in the men's doubles event at the inaugural European championships of 1914 in Reichenberg, Bohemia (now Liberec, Czech Republic).

References
List of European luge champions 

German male lugers
Year of birth missing
Year of death missing